Adam Gettis (born December 9, 1988) is a former American football guard. He was drafted by the Washington Redskins in the fifth round of the 2012 NFL Draft. He played college football for the University of Iowa.

Early years
From 2004 to 2006, Gettis played high school football for the Lincoln-Way East Griffins as a starter.  In 2005, Gettis and the Griffins went on to win the Class 8A State Championship in Illinois.

Professional career

Washington Redskins
Gettis was drafted in the fifth round of the 2012 NFL Draft by the Washington Redskins. He was officially signed by the Redskins to a four-year contract on May 5, 2012. After performing well in the preseason, even starting at the right guard position for the injured Chris Chester for the first two preseason games. He made the final 53-man roster by the start of the 2012 season, and made his NFL debut in Week 3 of the 2013 season against the Detroit Lions.

Gettis was waived on August 24, 2014.

Pittsburgh Steelers
Gettis was signed to the practice squad of the Pittsburgh Steelers on October 14, 2014.

New York Giants
Gettis was signed from the practice squad of the Steelers to the active roster of the New York Giants on December 16, 2014. On September 5, 2015, he was waived by the Giants. On September 6, 2015, he was signed to the Giants' practice squad. On October 15, 2015, Gettis was released by the Giants. On October 21, 2015, he was re-signed to the practice squad. On November 4, 2015, Gettis was released by the Giants.

Oakland Raiders
On November 17, 2015, Gettis was signed to the Oakland Raiders' practice squad.

Second stint with the Giants
On December 1, 2015, Gettis re-signed with the Giants. On September 3, 2016, he was released by the Giants and was signed to the practice squad the next day. He was promoted to the active roster on November 9, 2016. He was waived by the Giants on December 10, 2016 and was re-signed to the practice squad.

Gettis signed a reserve/future contract with the Giants on January 12, 2017. On August 28, 2017, Gettis was placed on injured reserve. He was released with a settlement on November 16, 2017.

Tampa Bay Buccaneers
On December 20, 2017, Gettis signed with the Tampa Bay Buccaneers. On March 26, 2018, Gettis re-signed with the Buccaneers. On September 11, 2018, Gettis was released by the Buccaneers.

Atlanta Falcons
On April 3, 2019, Gettis signed with the Atlanta Falcons. He was released on August 31, 2019.

Personal life
Gettis is the cousin of wide receiver David Gettis, who was drafted in sixth round of the 2010 NFL Draft by the Carolina Panthers.

He married Dionna Taylor on June 27, 2014 in Chicago, Illinois. They share a son together.

References

External links

Pittsburgh Steelers bio
Washington Redskins bio
Iowa Hawkeyes bio

1988 births
Living people
People from Frankfort, Illinois
Players of American football from Illinois
Sportspeople from Cook County, Illinois
American football offensive guards
Iowa Hawkeyes football players
Washington Redskins players
Pittsburgh Steelers players
New York Giants players
Oakland Raiders players
Tampa Bay Buccaneers players
Atlanta Falcons players